The following article is a summary of the 2019–20 football season in Armenia, which is the 28th season of competitive football in the country and runs from August 2019 to July 2020.

League tables

Armenian Premier League

Championship round

Relegation round

Armenian First League

Armenian Cup

Final

National team

UEFA Euro 2020 qualification

References

 
Seasons in Armenian football